Mary Ellen Tracy (aka Sabrina Aset) (born 1943) is the high priestess of the Church of the Most High Goddess, who was convicted in 1989 of a single misdemeanor count of running a house of prostitution in connection with the operation of the church, located in West Los Angeles, California. Tracy is a graduate of the University of Miami, cum laude in chemistry, did graduate work in chemistry at UCLA, and received her masters in Environmental Sciences/Chemistry from Portland State University.

The Church
According to Mary Ellen and Wilbur Tracy, the couple – both former devout and dedicated Mormons – created and founded the Modern Egyptian neo-pagan Church of the Most High Goddess following a divine revelation received at an oceanside cottage in Santa Monica, California, in the year 1984. In testimony later given in a Los Angeles superior court, Wilbur Tracy described "a brilliant light," through which "knowledge was being poured in without voice." Tracy further claimed that God appeared to him as an old man, with flowing white beard and long white hair.

On April 24, 1984, in broad daylight, I had a revelation that changed my life and the way I perceive the world and others. However, because I was blinded by the ignorance of the modern education, which I foolishly accepted as knowledge, I did not immediately understand the full impact of the revelation. I failed to understand that the mind can perceive only what the mind can conceive. What I experienced was beyond my conception, while my perception was completely distorted by what I had been taught was enlightenment. It was only when I set aside my prejudices – those beliefs which I had been conditioned to accept as fact, but which were in fact false – that I began to understand the experience.

As a result of their alleged divine experience, Mary Ellen and Wilbur Tracy founded the Church of the Most High Goddess, with precepts based on their own research into ancient Egyptian practices. Tracy, a classical scholar in her own right, assumed the role of High Priestess of the church, whose divine duties included engaging in sexual intercourse with congregants. According to Tracy herself, she had sex with over 2,000 men as part of a ritual of spiritual cleansing. In a post on her church's website, Tracy, who is bisexual, stated that she had had sexual contact with thousands of men and women over the course of her religious activities.

As a result of her various legal difficulties, Mary Ellen Tracy was asked to permanently discontinue her voluntary work with the Placerita Canyon Nature Center in Newhall, California.

During the late 1980s, The Newhall Signal, a daily newspaper published in Los Angeles County, presented a series of articles about the Church of the Most High Goddess, founded by Mary Ellen Tracy and her husband Wilbur Tracy, where sexual acts played a fundamental role in the church's sacred rites. The articles aroused the attention of local law enforcement officials, and in April 1989, the Tracy's house was searched and the couple arrested on charges of pimping, pandering and prostitution. They were subsequently convicted in a trial in state court and sentenced to jail terms: Wilbur Tracy for 180 days plus a $1,000.00 fine; Mary Ellen Tracy for 90 days plus mandatory screening for STDs.

Film and television
During the early 1990s, Mary Ellen Tracy hosted her own public-access television talk show series, Sabrina On ... . She has also appeared in a number of x-rated films under a variety of stage names, including the Positively Pagan series, and Club Head 2 (1991). On January 29, 1992, Mary Ellen Tracy was featured on a television broadcast of Donahue, as well as The Montel Williams Show, appearing with such other New-Age spiritualists as Aidan Kelly, First Officer of the Southern California Local Council of the Covenant of the Goddess, and Avilynn Waters of the Los Angeles Nest of the Church of All Worlds.

See also
 Devadasi
 Goddess movement
 Homosexuality in ancient Egypt
 Reclaiming (Neopaganism)
 Sex magic
 Sex worker

References

External links
Website for Sabrina Aset (Mary Ellen Tracy)
A Feminine Feminist by Sabrina Aset, High Priestess of the Church of The Most High Goddess

An Overview of Religion in Los Angeles from the 1930s to the 1980s, compiled by Clifton L. Holland 
Find A Case: August 28, 1996 Sabrina ASET et al., Appellants v. Gil Garcetti, as District Attorney, etc., Appellant Appeal from Second Appellate District, Division 4, No. B087160
Novelguide.com: Witchcraft and Neo-Paganism

1943 births
21st-century American chemists
American modern pagans
American television hosts
Converts to pagan religions
Former Latter Day Saints
Kemetism
Living people
Founders of modern pagan movements
University of Miami alumni
American women television presenters
21st-century American women
Bisexual actresses
American LGBT broadcasters
LGBT clergy